LeRoy Jacob "Tex" Mueller (July 29, 1916 – May 22, 2012) was an American professional basketball player. He played for the Oshkosh All-Stars of the National Basketball League for three seasons and averaged 1.0 point per game. He won the NBL championship in 1940–41.

After his basketball career, Mueller moved back to his home state of Texas and spent his career in the oil industry until retiring in 1981.

References

1916 births
2012 deaths
American men's basketball players
Basketball players from Texas
Guards (basketball)
Oshkosh All-Stars players
People from Yorktown, Texas
Western Colorado Mountaineers men's basketball players